Oswald Gilkes (25 February 1892 – 21 November 1932) was a Barbadian cricketer. He played in one first-class match for the Barbados cricket team in 1919/20.

See also
 List of Barbadian representative cricketers

References

External links
 

1892 births
1932 deaths
Barbadian cricketers
Barbados cricketers
People from Saint Michael, Barbados